Proparholaspulus is a genus of mites in the family Parholaspididae. There are at least three described species in Proparholaspulus.

Species
These three species belong to the genus Proparholaspulus:
 Proparholaspulus angustatus Ishikawa, 1987
 Proparholaspulus montanus Ishikawa, 1987
 Proparholaspulus suzukii Ishikawa, 1980

References

Parholaspididae
Articles created by Qbugbot